Mike Graham (born 24 February 1959) is an English former footballer who played in the Football League for Bolton Wanderers, Carlisle United,  Mansfield Town and Swindon Town. At Mansfield he helped them win the 1986–87 Associate Members' Cup, playing in the final.

References

English footballers
English Football League players
1959 births
Living people
Bolton Wanderers F.C. players
Mansfield Town F.C. players
Swindon Town F.C. players
Carlisle United F.C. players
Association football fullbacks